Dorey is a surname.

Notable people having this surname include:

Brett Dorey (born 1977), Australian cricketer
Graham Dorey (1932–2015), Bailiff of Guernsey
Halstead Dorey (1874–1946), head of the United States 2nd Infantry Division
Jean Dorey (1831–1872), Norman language writer
Jerry Dorey (born 1951), member of the States of Jersey from 1993 to 2005
Jim Dorey (born 1947), Canadian ice hockey player
Justin Dorey (born 1988), Canadian freestyle skier
Lewis Dorey (1901–1958), English cricketer